{{safesubst:#invoke:RfD|||month = March
|day = 20
|year = 2023
|time = 08:41
|timestamp = 20230320084141

|content=
REDIRECT KDLH

}}